David Alliance, Baron Alliance,  (born 15 June 1932) is an Iran-born British-Israeli businessman and Liberal Democrat politician.

Personal

David (originally Davoud) Alliance was born in Kashan, Iran, to a Jewish family and was educated at the Etahad School, Iran. He began his career in the bazaars of Iran at the age of fourteen and by the age of eighteen moved to Manchester, England. He has three children and five grandchildren, and now lives in Manchester and London.

Peerage
Alliance was appointed a Commander of the Order of the British Empire (CBE) in the 1984 New Year Honours and in the 1989 New Year Honours received a knighthood, the honour being bestowed 9 February 1989. He was created a life peer as Baron Alliance, of Manchester in the County of Greater Manchester, on 1 July 2004 and sits on the Liberal Democrat benches.

Career
He owns 33% and is chairman of N Brown Group plc, a clothing catalogue retailer. He was also the joint founder with Sir Harry Djanogly of Coats Viyella plc (now Coats Group plc) operating in 67 countries with 22% global market share, employing 70,000 people. Share sales, a valuable art collection and some small private firms account for the remainder of the family fortune. Alliance and Djanogly turned Coats Viyella into a £2bn textile business. David Alliance is also one of the primary investors of the web measurement company SimilarWeb.

Lord Alliance serves on a number of committees including the Prince's Youth Business Trust, Council for Industry and Higher Education, and the University of Manchester Foundation, and the Weizmann Institute. He is senior trustee of the Next Century Foundation. He serves on the Board of Governors of Tel Aviv University in Israel. He has a number of fellowships including Fellow of the Royal Society for the encouragement of Arts, Manufactures & Commerce; Fellow of the City and Guilds of London Institute; and Honorary Fellow of Shenkar College of Engineering and Design. 

Lord Alliance holds a Doctorate of Science at Heriot-Watt University and Legum Doctor (Doctor of Laws Honoris Causa) from the University of Manchester. He used to be an Honorary Fellow of UMIST as there is no UMIST anymore after the merger.

Alliance received an Honorary Doctorate from Heriot-Watt University in 1991

Between 1984 and 1991 Lord Alliance was instrumental in the rescue of the Ethiopian Jews out of Sudan and Ethiopia by bringing them to Israel.

Wealth
In the Sunday Times Rich List 2015 ranking of the wealthiest people in the UK he was placed with an estimated fortune of £3.1 billion. Since his elevation to the peerage in 2004, he has given the Liberal Democrats £668,872 in donations, plus an additional £20,996.56 in notional interest on loans he has made to the party.

Lord Alliance owns a home in Didsbury, Manchester and a mock-Georgian mansion in St John's Wood, an affluent area of north west London. He also owns a collection of Lowry paintings.

In 2012, Tel Aviv University established an Iranian Studies Center, named after Lord Alliance.

In September 2015, Manchester Business School was renamed in Alliance Manchester Business School (AMBS) in honour of Alliance, who has had a long-standing association with the school and wider university. AMBS's head, Fiona Devine, said that "The donation made by Lord Alliance and the Alliance Family Foundation will support the biggest transformation the school has seen since it was established some 50 years ago."

Alliance's autobiography, A Bazaar Life (co-written with Ivan Fallon), was published in 2015.

Arms

References

External links
 Lord Alliance Liberal Democrats profile
 

1932 births
Living people
British autobiographers
British businesspeople
British Jews
British philanthropists
British textile industry businesspeople
British people of Iranian-Jewish descent
Iranian emigrants to the United Kingdom
Iranian Jews
Commanders of the Order of the British Empire
Iranian philanthropists
Jewish British philanthropists
Liberal Democrats (UK) life peers
Tel Aviv University people
Jewish British politicians
Knights Bachelor
British politicians of Iranian descent
British billionaires
Life peers created by Elizabeth II